Max Mirnyi and Serena Williams were the defending champions but Williams did not compete due to injury. Mirnyi competed with Mary Pierce but lost in the second round to Martin Damm and Barbara Rittner.

Leander Paes and Lisa Raymond defeated Jonas Björkman and Anna Kournikova in the final, 6–4, 3–6, 6–3 to win the mixed doubles tennis title at the 1999 Wimbledon Championships.

Seeds

  Leander Paes /  Lisa Raymond (champions)
  Todd Woodbridge /  Lindsay Davenport (third round, retired)
  Jonas Björkman /  Anna Kournikova (final)
  Mark Knowles /  Elena Likhovtseva (semifinals)
  Cyril Suk /  Caroline Vis (second round)
  Rick Leach /  Larisa Neiland (quarterfinals)
  David Adams /  Mariaan de Swardt (second round)
  Justin Gimelstob /  Venus Williams (quarterfinals)
  John McEnroe /  Steffi Graf (semifinals, withdrew)
  Wayne Black /  Cara Black (third round)
  Sandon Stolle /  Kristine Kunce (first round)
  Andrew Florent /  Elena Tatarkova (second round)
  David Rikl /  Karina Habšudová (first round)
  Peter Tramacchi /  Ai Sugiyama (second round)
  Max Mirnyi /  Mary Pierce (second round)
  Piet Norval /  Katarina Srebotnik (third round)

Draw

Finals

Top half

Section 1

Section 2

Bottom half

Section 3

Section 4

References

External links

1999 Wimbledon Championships on WTAtennis.com
1999 Wimbledon Championships – Doubles draws and results at the International Tennis Federation

X=Mixed Doubles
Wimbledon Championship by year – Mixed doubles